Five submarines of the United States Navy have been named USS Wahoo, named after the fish, may refer to:

, also a Tench-class submarine, was laid down, but she was cancelled before being launched
, a planned 

United States Navy ship names